The Honey Prairie Fire was a 2011 wildfire that burned  of primarily scrub and brush in the Okefenokee Swamp are of southern Georgia. Because fire restores the prairie ecosystem, fire managers in the Okefenokee National Wildlife Refuge allowed the fire to burn. Fire fighters worked to preserve structures and keep the fire within the refuge rather than contain the flames.

Lightning started the fire on April 28, and by 6 p.m. on May 8, about  had burned. Most of the fire had burned by late July.

References

Wildfires in Georgia (U.S. state)
2011 wildfires in the United States
2011 in Georgia (U.S. state)